Shanti Grau Roney (born 24 November 1970) is a Swedish actor. While his film credits include nearly twenty movies, most of these have been limited to a domestic or Scandinavian release. One notable exception is Lukas Moodysson's film Together (2000) which gathered acclaim at film festivals worldwide.

In television, he had a prominent role in the popular series Tusenbröder while also featuring in the Danish series The Eagle which won an International Emmy Award in 2005. In 2011, Roney had a leading role in Crime Drama Arne Dahl.

Shanti Roney is brother to Nunu and Marimba Roney.

Filmography
 Tove (2020) as Atos Wirtanen 
 Quicksand (2019)
 Stockholm (2018) as Olof Palme
 Pojken med guldbyxorna (2014) as Torkel
Nymphomaniac (2013)
Arne Dahl (2011) as Paul Hjelm (10 episodes)
Vagn (2009) as Engberg
Metropia as (voice) Karl
Applause (2009) as Tom
 Flickan (2009)
 a.k.a. The Girl (Europe: English title: festival title)
 Julia (2009) as Bruno
 Wallander as Ralf (1 episode, 2009)
  - Tjuven (2009) TV episode .... Ralf
 Häxdansen (2008) TV mini-series .... Peter Brandt
 Der Kommissar und das Meer as Per Bovide (1 episode, 2008)
  - Sommerzeit (2008) TV episode .... Per Bovide
 En mand kommer hjem (2007) .... The cook
 a.k.a. A Man Comes Home (International: English title)
 a.k.a. En man kommer hem (Sweden)
 a.k.a. When a Man Comes Home (USA)
 Desmond & Träskpatraskfällan (2006) (voice)
 a.k.a. Desmond & The Swamp Barbarian Trap (International: English title)
 Smagsdommerne as Løvborg (1 episode, 2006)
  - Episode #3.8 (2006) TV episode .... Løvborg
 Vakuum (2006) .... The man
 Ørnen: En krimi-odyssé as Benjamin Stern (3 episodes, 2005)
 a.k.a. "Ørnen" (Denmark: short title)
 a.k.a. "The Eagle" (International: English title)
 - Kodenavn: Erinye - Del 11 (2005) TV episode
 - Kodenavn: Kronos - Del 10 (2005) TV episode
 - Kodenavn: Kronos - Del 9 (2005) TV episode
 Bang Bang Orangutang (2005) as Martin
 Desmonds trashade äppelträd (2004) (voice) as Desmond
 a.k.a. Desmond's Trashed Apple Tree (International: English title)
 Hotet (2004) as Lasse Brunell
 a.k.a. The Threat (International: English title)
 a.k.a. Uhka (Finland)
 Kommer du med mig då (2003) as Theodor Marklund
 a.k.a. Kehystetty rakkaus (Finland)
 a.k.a. Make Believe (International: English title)
 Norrmalmstorg (2003) (TV) .... Clark Olofsson
 Talismanen (2003) TV mini-series .... Viktor
 Freddies och Leos äventyr (2003) (TV) .... Berättare
 a.k.a. The Adventures of Freddie and Leo (International: English title)
 Tusenbröder as Niklas (5 episodes, 2002)
 a.k.a. "Tusenbröder II" (Sweden: second season title)
 a.k.a. "Tusenbröder III" (Sweden: third season title)
 - Tusenbröder - Del 5 (2002) TV episode
 - Tusenbröder - Del 4 (2002) TV episode
 - Tusenbröder - Del 3 (2002) TV episode
 - Tusenbröder - Del 2 (2002) TV episode
 - Tusenbröder - Del 1 (2002) TV episode
 Kaspar i Nudådalen as the Narrator (24 episodes, 2001)
 - Episode #1.24 (2001) TV episode (voice)
 - Episode #1.23 (2001) TV episode (voice)
 - Episode #1.22 (2001) TV episode (voice)
 - Episode #1.21 (2001) TV episode (voice)
 - Episode #1.20 (2001) TV episode (voice) (19 more)
 Syndare i sommarsol (2001) as Alf
 Øyenstikker (2001) as Mann i leilighet
 a.k.a. Dragonflies (UK)
 a.k.a. Dragonfly (International: English title)
 Beck – Hämndens pris as Dag Sjöberg (1 episode, 2001)
 Så vit som en snö (2001) as Lars Andersson
 a.k.a. As White as in Snow (International: English title)
 a.k.a. Så hvid som sne (Denmark)
 Hans och hennes (2001) as Clarence
 a.k.a. His and Hers (literal English title)
 a.k.a. Making Babies (International: English title)
 En fot i graven (2001) TV mini-series
 Skuggpojkarna (2001) (TV) as Per
 Tillsammans (2000) as Klas
 a.k.a. Together (International: English title) (Italy)
 a.k.a. Tillsammans (Denmark)
 Födelsedagen (2000) .... Peter
 a.k.a. The Birthday (International: English title)
 Ett litet rött paket as Jesper Olsén (1 episode, 1999)
 - Drömmen om Elin (1999) TV episode
 Clinch (1999) as Ralle
 Vägen ut (1999) as Glenn
 a.k.a. Breaking Out (International: English title)
 Personkrets 3:1 (1998) (TV) as Micke
 S:t Mikael as Nilsson (1 episode, 1998)
 - Episode #1.5 (1998) TV episode
 Hammarkullen (1997) TV mini-series as Josef, Frank's son
 a.k.a. "Vi ses i Kaliningrad!" (Sweden)
 Harry och Sonja (1996) as Jonathan

Trivia
Roney played the role of Clark Olofsson in a 2003 TV movie about the 1973 Norrmalmstorg robbery, which coined the phrase "Stockholm syndrome".

References

External links

1970 births
Living people
Swedish male actors
Best Supporting Actor Guldbagge Award winners